Fridericus is a 1937 German historical film directed by Johannes Meyer and starring Otto Gebühr, Hilde Körber and Lil Dagover. It is based on the life of Frederick II of Prussia. It was part of the popular cycle of Prussian films. It was shot at the Halensee Studios in Berlin and on location in Brandenburg. The film's sets were designed by the art directors Otto Erdmann and Hans Sohnle.

Main cast
 Otto Gebühr as Friedrich II., König von Preußen
 Hilde Körber as Wilhelmine – seine Schwester
 Lil Dagover as Marquise de Pompadour
 Agnes Straub as Czarina Elisabeth
 Käthe Haack as Maria Theresia
 Bernhard Minetti as Count Wallis, alias Marquis DuVal
 Paul Klinger as von Bonin
 Carola Höhn as Louise – seine Frau
 Paul Dahlke as Field Marshal von Dessau
 Lucie Höflich as Frau Büttner
 Wilhelm König as Hans – ihr Sohn – Student
 Will Dohm as Baron Warkotsch
 Paul Westermeier as Musketeer Mampe
 Heinrich Schroth as Capt. von Droste
 Alfred Gerasch as Field Marshal Daun
 Ernst Schiffner - Austrian Staff-Officer

References

Bibliography

External links

1937 films
1930s biographical films
1930s historical films
German biographical films
German historical films
Films of Nazi Germany
1930s German-language films
Films directed by Johannes Meyer
Prussian films
Films set in the 1750s
Films set in the 1760s
Seven Years' War films
Biographical films about German royalty
Biographical films about French royalty
Biographical films about Austrian royalty
Cultural depictions of Frederick the Great
Cultural depictions of Madame de Pompadour
Tobis Film films
Films shot at Halensee Studios
German black-and-white films
1930s German films